This is a list of women Teachtaí Dála (TDs). It includes all women who have been elected to  Dáil Éireann, the lower house of the Oireachtas, the bicameral parliament of Ireland.

History
As of July 2021, a total of 131 women have been elected to the Dáil. The first woman TD was Constance Markievicz, elected in 1918 to the 1st Dáil, and she was joined by five other women in the 2nd Dáil. The number fell to one  in the 6th Dáil, rose again and fell back to two in the 9th Dáil.

The 1981 general election to the 22nd Dáil saw the tally exceed ten for the first time, when six newly elected women brought the total to eleven. The arrival of nine newly elected women TDs in 1992 brought a total of 20 women to the 27th Dáil. 25 women were elected at the 2011 general election to the 31st Dáil. 35 women (22%) were elected to the 32nd Dáil in 2016.

Women in Dáil Éireann

Timeline

Number of women elected in each Dáil

See also
Families in the Oireachtas
List of women in Seanad Éireann
Records of members of the Oireachtas

Notes

References

Sources and external links

Oireachtas Members Database
ElectionsIreland.org

Teachtai Dala
+Women
 
Teachtai Dala